Estadio Ciro López is a football stadium located in Popayán, Colombia. The stadium was opened on 8 July 1951 with a match between the Cauca Department football team and Millonarios, who were at the time known as the Ballet Azul (Blue Ballet). It has a capacity of 5,000 spectators and served as home stadium for Independiente Popayán, Atlético Popayán, Dimerco Real Popayán, and Universitario Popayán, teams that competed in the Categoría Primera B.

References 

Football venues in Colombia
Sports venues completed in 1951